Phantom in the Twilight is a Japanese and Chinese anime television series produced by the game developer Happy Elements and animated by the studio Liden Films. The series aired from July 10 to September 25, 2018. A manga adaptation was launched in March 2018.

Synopsis
Set in modern day London, the story takes place in a world where "Shadows" are born from human fear and anxiety. A young girl arrives to study abroad, only to be caught in a bizarre incident as she enters university. In a city with no acquaintances, the helpless girl wanders into "Café Forbidden," a mysterious café that exclusively opens at midnight. She meets an assortment of handsome men employed at the café, where guardians who protect the boundary between humans and shadow convene.

Characters

A Chinese student who refuses her parents' advice to go study abroad in the United Kingdom, she is the great-granddaughter of Sha Rijan. On her right hand, she wears a magical ring that is passed down by her great-grandma. She's strong-willed and determined in spite of many difficulties she deals with.

A Romanian vampire and descendant of Dracula, he carries many traits of a typical vampire like his ancestors. He has been accustommed to drinking human blood, before meeting Ton's great-grandmother, whom he vows not to drink more human blood. He's calculated, calm and strict with the duty he has followed.

A werewolf from Britain, he has a funny and relaxing attitude when talking to his friends. However, he has a hidden past where he uses to rampage his home village and reacts by emotions before meeting Vlad and Tauryu.

An umbra originally created for self-destruction, his meeting with Sha Rijan help changed his heart. He's a very loyal and will be very protective when it comes to Ton.

A living mannequin, he is originally a ghost before taking this mannequin form. He has another alternative side, a destructive umbra referred to as 'the lord of gluttony'.

Not many information is known about him, except he's a 13th generation descendant of Abraham Van Helsing. He is known to be very mean towards Umbras and very kind and loyal towards humans.

A powerful Taoist who creates Tauryu, he is a member of the “Midnight Sun” organisation who wants to wipe out the Umbras, yet he is only treated as an outsider, much to his dismay. He orchestrates the kidnap of Mu Shinyao with the hope to force Ton to activate her power so he can suck her ability for his own ambition of eternal youth power. He's also a great-great-great uncle of Ton by surprise.

The younger brother of Luke, whose relationship has been strained due to the village massacre caused by Luke in the past.

She's Ton's closest friend and a carefree girl who easily accepts the existence of Umbras.

A police inspector who works in the Scotland Yard, he belongs to the department related to umbra issues and has close relations with members in the Cafe Forbidden.

Production and release
Mobile game company Happy Elements announced the original anime on March 25, 2018. The series is a Japanese and Chinese coproduction. The anime is directed by Kunihiro Mori and written by Fumiaki Maruto and Shunsaku Yano, with animation by studio Liden Films. Hidari designed the characters, and Megumi Yamashita adapted the designs for animation. Z-Ton provided the creature designs for the series. The series aired from July 10 to September 25, 2018, and broadcast on Tokyo MX and BS Fuji. Crunchyroll simulcasted the series.

Manga
Haruta Mayuzumi launched a manga adaptation of the series on LINE Manga on March 25, 2018.

Reception
The anime series' first episode received generally positive reviews from Anime News Network's staff during the Summer 2018 season previews. While finding the overall plot awkwardly delivered and lacking development, James Beckett praised Ton Baileu as the main heroine, the male cast having solid rapport with one another and the action scenes they take place in, concluding that fans of otome video games will enjoy it. Theron Martin praised the execution of a "pretty straightforward reverse-harem premise", highlighting the characterization of Ton and her male harem, and both the animation and soundtrack that culminate into "a respectable production effort." Rebecca Silverman also commended Ton as a character and both the character designs and fight scenes but found the episode overall to be "a messy and over-stuffed affair", concluding that viewers will enjoy it if they accept the melodrama and unintentional humor. Nick Creamer was critical of the show's slow opening, animation and staying too close to their given genre with its story but gave praise to the overall execution with its main cast having chemistry, engaging fantasy setting and Ton being a more than capable heroine, concluding that "[I]f you're in the mood for a supernatural fantasy, it's definitely worth a look."

Fellow ANN editor Christopher Farris reviewed the complete anime series. He also gave praise to Ton's leading presence carrying the show, along with the supernatural worldbuilding involving its cast of Twilights but found criticism in the off-model character art and a "general lack of complex, impressive animation" outside of the art direction and a few "battle-heavy" scenes in the final episodes that are hampered by lackluster villains, concluding that, "Even though most of its individual elements are pretty mediocre, Phantom in the Twilight isn't so difficult to recommend - there's enough strong material in here to elevate the show to "pleasant surprise" status, a good-enough romp worth watching if you have a craving for sexy supernatural boyfriends, and want a series that likely won't disappoint you." Silverman placed the series at number three on her top 5 best anime list of 2018, praising the action-harem plot being carried by Ton's no-nonsense characterization and the male harem having distinct personalities from each other, concluding with, "Add in some nice attention to folklore and literature, and Phantom in the Twilight becomes the reverse harem show for people who don't like the genre or who want to see it do something new."

Notes

References

External links
 
 

Anime with original screenplays
Liden Films
NBCUniversal Entertainment Japan
Male harem anime and manga
Television shows set in London
Tokyo MX original programming